Husavik or Húsavik may refer to:

 Húsavík, a town in Norðurþing municipality on the north coast of Iceland
 Húsavík Airport, an airport serving Húsavík, Iceland
 Husavik, Norway, a village in Austevoll municipality in Vestland county, Norway
 Húsavík Municipality, a municipality of the Faroe Islands
 Húsavík, Faroe Islands, a village in the Isle of Sandoy, in Húsavík Municipality, Faroe Islands
 Husavik, Manitoba, a community of the Rural Municipality of Gimli, Manitoba, Canada
 "Husavik" (song), a 2020 song performed by Will Ferrell and My Marianne in the film Eurovision Song Contest: The Story of Fire Saga